Chakori, is a Pakistani Urdu feature film. This film was released on 22 March 1967 on Eid-ul-Azha Day in Dhaka, East Pakistan (now Bangladesh). The film was directed by Captain Ehtesham.

It was Nadeem's and Shabana's debut film. The film ran for 81 weeks, and became a platinum jubilee film.

Cast 
Nadeem Baig as Anwer/Anu
Shabana as Chakori
Reshma 
Mirza Shahi as Professor Patle Khan Footpathia
Mustafa, Dear Asghar
Jalil Afghani
Irfan

Music 
Music director Robin Ghosh won the Nigar Award for Best Musician for this film.

Songs 
Kabhi to tumko yaad ayengi Sung by Ahmed Rushdi, lyrics by Akhtar Yousuf and music by Robin Ghosh
Kahan ho tum ko dhoondh rahi hain by Nadeem and Ferdausi Rahman
Woh mere saamne tasveer bane baithe hain by Mujeeb Alam
Woh mere saamne tasveer bane baithe hain by Ferdausi Rahman
Khanak jaye re chaandi ka mora jhoomka by Ferdausi Rahman
Pyaare pyaare yaar hamaare by Ahmed Rushdi
Tujhe Chahein Meri Banhein by Ahmed Rushdi
Rut Hai Jawan by Najma Niazi

Box office
The film was a platinum jubilee hit. It ran in cinemas for 81 consecutive weeks.

Nigar Awards

Impact
Chakori was a debut movie of Nadeem Baig and launched his long and successful career as a superstar in Lollywood.

References

External links

1960s Urdu-language films
Pakistani black-and-white films
Pakistani romantic musical films
1967 films
Nigar Award winners
Films scored by Robin Ghosh
Films directed by Ehtesham
Urdu-language Bangladeshi films
Urdu-language Pakistani films